Brian Lee Felsner (born November 7, 1972) is an American former professional ice hockey left winger who played 12 games with the Chicago Blackhawks in the National Hockey League during the 1997–98 season. The rest of his career, which lasted from 1996 to 2008, was spent in the minor leagues and then in various European leagues. Felsner's brother Denny was also a professional hockey player.

Playing career
As a youth, Felsner played in the 1985 and 1986 Quebec International Pee-Wee Hockey Tournaments with the Detroit Compuware and Detroit Red Wings minor ice hockey teams.

Felsner played twelve games for the Chicago Blackhawks during the 1997–98 NHL season, scoring a goal and three assists for four points.  He first moved to Europe in 2001, playing in Germany's Deutsche Eishockey Liga for Kassel Huskies.  He then played two seasons in the Swedish Elitserien for Linköpings HC and four games in Switzerland's Nationalliga A for the Kloten Flyers before returning to Germany to play for Augsburger Panther.

He returned to Elitserien to play for Brynäs IF and then returned to American to play for the Port Huron Icehawks of the International Hockey League before moving to Slovenia to finish his career with HDD Olimpija Ljubljana of the Austrian Hockey League.

Career statistics

Regular season and playoffs

References

External links
 

1972 births
Living people
American men's ice hockey left wingers
Augsburger Panther players
Brynäs IF players
Chicago Blackhawks players
Cincinnati Cyclones (IHL) players
Compuware Ambassadors players
Detroit Vipers players
EHC Biel players
HDD Olimpija Ljubljana players
Herning Blue Fox players
Houston Aeros (1994–2013) players
Ice hockey players from Michigan
Indianapolis Ice players
Kassel Huskies players
EHC Kloten players
Lake Superior State Lakers men's ice hockey players
Linköping HC players
Lowell Lock Monsters players
Milwaukee Admirals (IHL) players
NCAA men's ice hockey national champions
Orlando Solar Bears (IHL) players
People from Mount Clemens, Michigan
Port Huron Flags players
Port Huron Icehawks players
Sportspeople from Metro Detroit
Undrafted National Hockey League players